List of American records in swimming may refer to:

List of United States records in swimming
List of Americas records in swimming